Bárbaro Garbey (born December 4, 1956) is a former Major League Baseball utility player and minor league coach. Garbey played in the outfield, at first and third bases, and also served as designated hitter.

Playing Career
Garbey defected from Cuba in the Mariel boatlift in 1980. He was signed by the Detroit Tigers as an amateur free agent that year. He reached the majors in 1984 with the Tigers, spending two years with them, earning team Rookie of the Year honors in 1984, before moving to the Texas Rangers (1988). He was a member of the Tigers team that defeated the San Diego Padres in the 1984 World Series.

As a rookie in 1984, Garbey played in 110 games, including appearances at first base, second base, third base, designated hitter, and each of the outfield positions. Garbey hit .287 and had more RBIs (52) than several of Detroit's starters, including Howard Johnson, Larry Herndon, and Dave Bergman.

In 1983, Bárbaro was suspended for attacking a fan after a 10-inning game against Louisville.

Coaching Career
Since retiring, Garbey has found steady work coaching in the minor leagues. He spent two seasons (2014-15) as hitting coach for the Peoria Chiefs, then became a roving instructor for the Cardinals' farm system.

Garbey was named as the hitting coach for the rookie level Danville Braves in the Atlanta Braves organization for the 2018 season.

Garbey was named as the hitting coach for the GCL Braves in the Atlanta Braves organization for the 2019 season. He left the organization in 2020.

See also
1984 Detroit Tigers season
List of baseball players who defected from Cuba

References

External links

1956 births
Living people
Major League Baseball players from Cuba
Cuban expatriate baseball players in the United States
Defecting Cuban baseball players
Detroit Tigers players
Texas Rangers players
Lakeland Tigers players
Birmingham Barons players
Evansville Triplets players
Oklahoma City 89ers players
Jacksonville Expos players
Albuquerque Dukes players
Major League Baseball outfielders
Major League Baseball first basemen
Major League Baseball third basemen
Major League Baseball designated hitters
Tecolotes de los Dos Laredos players
Tigres del México players
Petroleros de Minatitlán players
Leones de Yucatán players
Minor league baseball coaches
Cuban expatriate baseball players in Mexico
Sportspeople from Santiago de Cuba